National Handicapped Finance and Development Corporation (NHFDC) was set up in January 1997 as a not for profit company under Ministry of Social Justice and Empowerment, Government of India. The corporation provides financial assistance for wide range of income generating activities to disabled persons.

The company is managed by Board of Directors nominated by Government of India.

External links

References 

Government-owned companies of India
Financial services companies of India
Ministry of Social Justice and Empowerment